The Good Clinical Practice Directive (Directive 2005/28/EC of 8 April 2005 of the European Parliament and of the Council) lays down principles and detailed guidelines for good clinical practice as regards conducting clinical trials of medicinal products for human use, as well as the requirements for authorisation of the manufacturing or importation of such products.

The directive deals with the following items:

Good clinical practice for the design, conduct, recording and reporting of clinical trials:
Good Clinical Practice (GCP)
The Ethics Committee
The sponsors
Investigator's Brochure
Manufacturing or import authorisation
Exemption for Hospital & Health Centres and Reconstitution
Conditions of Holding a Manufacturing Licence
The Trial master file and archiving
Format of Trial Master File
Retention of Essential and Medical Records
Inspectors
Inspection procedures
Final provisions

References
 Text of the directive: Commission Directive 2005/28/EC of 8 April 2005 laying down principles and detailed guidelines for good clinical practice as regards investigational medicinal products for human use, as well as the requirements for authorisation of the manufacturing or importation of such products
 National implementing measures of the EU-countries

See also
 EudraLex
 Directive 65/65/EEC1
 Directive 75/318/EEC
 Directive 75/319/EEC
 Directive 93/41/EEC
 Directive 2001/20/EC
 Directive 2001/83/EC
 Regulation of therapeutic goods
 European Medicines Agency
 Common Technical Document

European clinical research
Pharmaceuticals policy
European Union directives
2005 in law
2005 in the European Union
Good practice
Life sciences industry